Kurunjang Secondary College is a co-educational secondary school built in 1986, in Kurunjang, Victoria, Australia.

The principal of the school is supported by 3 assistant principals. John Mitsinikos was appointed as Principal in July 2016, following the departure of Sandra Eglezos, who had been in post since 27 January 2009; assistant principals appointed were David Veale, Aylin Gökmen, and Tim Davey.

The school's community partners include Kurunjang Primary, Melton Primary, Wedge Park Primary, Melton West Primary and many other Schools. The School also neighbours the Melton campus of Heathdale Christian College.

Curricular programmes

VCE

The Victorian Certificate of Education (VCE) is generally completed over a two-year period, but may be completed over an extended period.
Students may select from over 30 studies or subjects. Each study is made up of at least four semester or half-year length units of study. Unit 1 and 2 are usually taken in year 11. Units 3 and 4 are usually taken in year 12. Units 1 and 2 may be taken separately but units 3 & 4 must be taken together as a sequence. Students can begin most studies at level 2 or 3 without having studied the previous unit. Over the two VCE years, most students will undertake 22 to 24 semester-length units.

VCAL

Victorian Certificate of Applied Learning (VCAL) is a Senior School qualification that is based on Applied Learning. It is a hands-on course that gets students ready for further training or employment. VCAL has three levels of certificate: Foundation, Intermediate and
Senior. Senior is the highest level. Students would start at the level which matches their needs and your abilities. For example, if they complete Intermediate level in Year 11 they can move up to the Senior level in Year 12. Each level normally takes a year to complete.

VET

A VET in the VCE program enables students to earn a nationally recognised VET/TAFE Certificate in addition to a VCE Certificate. VET in the VCE links training to industry. Research has confirmed that a significant number of students are entering higher education or continuing with further training after successfully completing a VET in the VCE program.

AVID
AVID is a college readiness system for elementary through higher education.

Students in the AVID program use the "Cornell Notes" system of note-taking. Students take part in twice-monthly tutorials with Pre-service teachers from Victoria University.

The AVID classes frequently attend excursions, for example, in February 2014, AVID students (from all schools) went to Victoria University to listen to the famous adventurer, Troy Henkels.

Student voice

Student Voice organizes events including the Variety Concert and fund-raising events. The members of Student Voice include College Captains and Class Captains.

Instrumental music program
The instrumental music program allows students to learn a musical instrument. It is available to all 7-12 students, and woodwind and brass instruments may be taken home to practice.

Alumni

 Tim Ward (Pro Skater)
 Matthew Leckie (Socceroo)
 Kyla Kirkpatrick (Champagne Dame)
 Ajak Deng(Model)
 James Sicily (AFL Footballer)

See also

 List of schools in Victoria, Australia
 Victorian Certificate of Education

Notes

External links
Official website

News Articles
 Students Clean Up
 Melton students use music to spread the word against bullying
 Paralympian Ahmed Kelly inspires Kurunjang students
 Famous adventurer inspires AVID students

Sources
 http://www.kurunjangsc.vic.edu.au
 http://www.abc.net.au/worldtoday/content/2012/s3519340.htm (published June 2012, retrieved 11 May 2014)

Public high schools in Victoria (Australia)
Educational institutions established in 1983
1983 establishments in Australia
Buildings and structures in the City of Melton